Trancers 6 is a 2002 American science fiction horror film directed by Jay Woelfel and starring Zette Sullivan, Jennifer Capo, Robert Donavan, Timothy Prindle, Jere Jon, Jennifer Cantrell, Ben Bar, James R. Hilton, Kyle O. Ingleman, Gregory Lee Kenyon and Douglas Smith. The film was produced by Johnnie J. Young of Young Wolf Productions.

It is the final Installment in the Trancers franchise.

Synopsis
In a return to the original film's premise, Jack Deth is back – traveling back in time and into the body of his own daughter, Josephine (Zette Sullivan), on a mission to save her life and save the world from the most lethal Trancers yet. Jack / Jo must adapt and survive, avoiding many assassination attempts by more powerful and dangerous zombie-like Trancers than he's ever faced before.

Cast
 Zette Sullivan as Josephine Forrest / Jo Deth
 Jennifer Capo as Shauna Wilder
 Robert Donavan as Dr. Paul Malvern
 James R. Hilton as Dr. Jennings
 Timothy Prindle as Mark
 Jere Jon as Sam
 Ben Bar as Mr. Castle
 Robert Rocque as Deputy Mayor
 Cindy Olmscheid as Deputy Mayor's Wife
 Jozo Zovko as Trancer Joe
 Ivona Rocque as Trancer Girl #1
 Sasha Gallardo as Trancer Girl #2
 Carlos Long as Pimp
 Jennifer Cantrell as Jennings' Hooker
 Christopher Farrell as Jack Deth Double (uncredited)
 Tim Thomerson as Jack Deth (archive footage) (uncredited)

Production
Jack Deth's appearances in his own body are done with stock footage from previous films.

Reception
Reception for the film has been overall negative, mainly due to the lack of Tim Thomerson.

References

External links
 
 
 

2002 films
2000s English-language films
2000 horror films
American science fiction horror films
2000s science fiction horror films
American sequel films
Films shot in Los Angeles
Trancers (film series)
2000s American films